The German Council on Foreign Relations is Germany's national foreign policy network and policy research institute. As an independent, private, non-partisan and non-profit organisation, the Council actively takes part in political decision-making and promotes the understanding of German foreign policy and international relations.

It serves as forum for foreign policy and facilitates a comprehensive network of political, economic and academic decision makers. The institution aims at linking foreign politicians to the German public.

History
The association was founded in 1955 in Bonn. The model for the foundation was in many respects the Council on Foreign Relations in New York and the Chatham House in London. The first president of the newly founded DGAP was the CDU politician, diplomat and entrepreneur Günther Henle.

In Bonn, the DGAP was seated in the villa at Joachimstraße 7 between 1956 and 1959 and then in the Villa Schaumburg-Lippe-Straße 6 between 1965 and 1966. In 1965 it acquired the former House of Craftsmen at Adenauerallee 131a in Bonn, including the Villa Adenauerallee 131, which in later years served as a logo of DGAP, for the first time its own building. It served as headquarters of the DGAP from April 1966 to 1999.

The current seat of the DGAP is the building of the Yugoslav embassy in the embassy district in Berlin-Tiergarten.

Activities
Internationally known as the "German Council on Foreign Relations", the DGAP sees itself as a practical think tank offering demand-driven policy advice on a scientific basis. It works to actively influence the foreign policy opinion-forming at all levels. Its work is aimed at decision-makers in German politics, business, public administration, in NGOs, in the military and to the general public. DGAP publishes the bimonthly journal Internationale Politik. Also, it is among other organisers of the EU-Russia Forum.

The Council provides:
 A platform for discussions at conferences and in study group meetings as well as at public events.
 Policy oriented analyses from research institute fellows.
 Authoritative publications on contemporary topics by its journal Internationale Politik, the Jahrbuch Internationale Politik as well as in the publications from the research institute.
 Expert and extensive documentation by its library and documentation section.

High-level guest speakers have in recent years included Angela Merkel (2006), Christine Lagarde (2012), Ali Akbar Salehi (2013), Recep Tayyip Erdoğan (2014), Mohammad Javad Zarif (2015), Paolo Gentiloni (2015), Volodymyr Groysman (2018), Nikos Kotzias (2018) and Nirmala Sitharaman (2019).

Network
The DGAP is a member of the European Movement Germany.

Controversy
In 2019, Microsoft announced that it had detected cyberattacks, which occurred between September and December 2018, targeting employees of the DGAP; they are believed to have originated from a group called Strontium.

Governance

Leadership
 1955-1973 – Günther Henle
 1973-1981 – Kurt Birrenbach
 1987-1993 – Christian Peter Henle
 1993-1999 – Werner Lamby
 1999-2001 – Ulrich Cartellieri
 2001-2003 – Hans-Dietrich Genscher
 2003-2005 – Alfred Freiherr von Oppenheim
 2005-2019 – Arend Oetker
 2019–present – Tom Enders

Funding
DGAP is financed through the contributions of its members, acquired project funds and contributions from sponsors and patrons, including among others, the Federal Foreign Office, Deutsche Bank, Airbus, the Robert Bosch Foundation, and the Open Society Foundations.

Notable members
Prominent members are the former foreign minister Hans-Dietrich Genscher, the former President of Germany Richard von Weizsäcker, as well as some other famous German politicians and academics Volker Rühe, Günter Verheugen, Klaus von Dohnanyi, Eberhard Diepgen, Theodor Waigel, Michael Glos, Friedbert Pflüger, Rudolf Scharping, Dieter Schulte, Manfred Stolpe, Rita Süssmuth, and Antje Vollmer.

References

External links
 Homepage
 Homepage "Internationale Politik"

International relations
Think tanks based in Germany